The Anglican Cathedral of St. John the Baptist is a cathedral in Buenos Aires, Argentina. It is located in Calle 25 de Mayo (25 May Street) and is the oldest non-Catholic church building in Latin America.

History
The construction started 1830 and was completed in 1831. It is the oldest non-Catholic church building in South America.

The church was constructed in record time and in a neo-classical style new to the city after a treaty was signed between the United Kingdom and Argentina in 1825, granting tolerance for the religion of British subjects resident in the country, and aided by a generous subsidy from the British government. The site, originally the cemetery of the convent of the Mercedarian friars, was donated by the then ruler of Argentina, Juan Manuel de Rosas.

From then until the present day and in the midst of numerous civil wars and conflicts, sieges and revolutions, the church has maintained a continuous presence and ministry three blocks from the seat of government, the Casa Rosada. Naturally it has undergone changes to its fabric, including the addition of a chancel in the 19th century to emphasize the importance of the Eucharist and the construction of choirs stalls, canons’ stalls, and bishop’s throne in the 20th century.  An excellent organ was also donated in the Victorian period. With time the walls became adorned with memorials and the windows were filled with stained glass. In 2000  the church was declared a national historical and artistic monument.

The Cathedral is the Mother Church of the Diocese of Argentina and it is the place where the Diocesan Bishop and Dean, the Rt. Rev. Gregory J. Venables, has his “cathedra” or seat of honor. The Cathedral serves as a center for diocesan activities, and also it is home to a dynamic Christian community. The membership is national and international, caring, diverse and welcoming, committed to the Gospel of Jesus Christ, and inspired to share God’s love with all.

Worship

Heritage designations
On December 29, 2000, the church was declared a National Historic and Artistic Monument by the Argentine Republic.

See also

 Anglican Bishop of Argentina

References

External links

 https://archive.today/20141201061306/http://catedralanglicana.com/
 St John's Anglican Church, Buenos Aires - Studies in 19th and 20th century emigration at British Settlers in Argentina
 Baptisms, 1825 to 1915 Studies in 19th and 20th century emigration at British Settlers in Argentina
 Marriages, 1824 to 1915 Studies in 19th and 20th century emigration at British Settlers in Argentina
 Early Burials - Protestant Burials in the Socorro and Victoria Cemeteries, 1821 to 1857 Studies in 19th and 20th century emigration at British Settlers in Argentina
 Later Burials - Church Burials in the Victoria and Chacarita Cemeteries, 1858 to 1915 Studies in 19th and 20th century emigration at British Settlers in Argentina
 Monumental Inscriptions in the church Buenos Aires, Rosario and Bell Ville - Studies in 19th and 20th century emigration at British Settlers in Argentina

19th-century Anglican church buildings
Cathedrals in Argentina
Churches completed in 1831
Cathedrals in Buenos Aires
Religious buildings and structures in Buenos Aires
Buildings and structures in Buenos Aires